Edmund Stuart Bittinger (born July 4, 1951), better known by Ned Bittinger, is an American portrait painter and illustrator whose work includes the official Congressional portraits of Abraham Lincoln and Lindy Boggs for the US Capitol, as well as Secretaries of State James Baker and Lawrence Eagleburger's official State Department portraits.

Early life and education 

Ned Bittinger was born in 1951 in Washington, D.C. He started painting and drawing in the third grade. When he was 13, his parents sent him to the Cochran Art School of Washington, D.C. He attended Landon School in Bethesda, MD, before leaving for Denison University in Ohio, where he received a Bachelor of Fine Arts. He then earned his Master of Fine Arts degree from the Corcoran School of the Arts and Design at George Washington University.

Career 

Ned Bittinger has received awards and participated in many exhibitions, including an exhibition at the Tretyakov Gallery in Moscow from 1990 to 1991.

Portrait of Abraham Lincoln 
In 2004, the US House of Representatives commissioned Bittinger to paint the Official portrait of Abraham Lincoln. The portrait depicts President Lincoln at a young age when he served in congress from 1847 to 1849 as well as many details of the Chamber in the 1840s. Bittinger worked from photographs of Lincoln in congress and used historical images of the House Chamber.

Portrait of Lindy Boggs 
On September 27, 2004, the portrait of Lindy Boggs was unveiled at the Capitol. The portrait includes a small replica of the Car of History clock which has been present in the Old House Chamber since 1819. This clock was included to show Bogg's love for history and commemorate the Commission of the United States House of Representatives Bicentenary, which she chaired. The portrait hangs in the Lindy Claiborne Boggs Congressional Women's Reading Room in the US Capitol adjacent to Statuary Hall.

Ohio Speakers' Portraits 
In 2017, the Ohio Statehouse commissioned 7 speakers' portraits 3 painted by Bittinger, 3 by Daniel Greene, and 1 by Leslie Adams. The portraits were unveiled in a ceremony in the Ohio Statehouse Rotunda on May 23, 2017. “The seven portraits broaden the scope and artistic diversity of the Ohio Statehouse’s art collection instantly. These works of art will inspire and educate future leaders of Ohio for generations to come,” said The Capitol Square Review and Advisory Board executive director, Laura Battocletti.

Books 
From 1995 through 2002, Bittinger illustrated 4 children's books. “Rocking Horse Christmas" written by Mary Pope Osborne was chosen by The American Booksellers as their "Pick of the List." "The Blue and the Gray" written by Eve Bunting received the "Hoosier Young Readers' Award" from the children of Indiana and the "Teachers' Choice Award" from The International Readers Association. He also illustrated "When the Root Children Wake up" by Audrey Wood and "The Matzah that Papa Brought Home" by Fran Manushkin, which became an American Library Association Notable Children's Book.

Notable commissions and awards 

 Lloyd Elliott, President of The George Washington University, Elliott School of International Affairs, 1988
 Gen. Carl Vuono, Chief of Staff of the Army 1991
 James Baker, Secretary of State, US State Department, Washington, D.C., 1994
 Gen. Gordon Sullivan, Chief of Staff of the Army 1994
 Carol Joyce Gray, First Dean of the John's Hopkins University School of Nursing, 1994
 Lawrence Eagleburger, Secretary of State, US State Department, Washington, D.C., 1995

 Abraham Lincoln, Official portrait for the US House of Representatives, 2004
 Lindy Boggs, Congresswoman, Louisiana, 1973-1991, portrait hangs in the Lindy Claiborne Boggs Congressional Women's Reading Room, US Capitol, Wash., D.C. 2004

 Henry Kissinger, Former Sec. of State, College of William & Mary, 2005
 Jack S. Griswold, President, Maryland Historical Society, 2005
 Stanard T. Klinefelter, President, Maryland Historical Society, 2005
 Chief Justice Barker, Hamilton County Courthouse, Chattanooga, TN, 2010

 John Mica, US Congressman from Florida, US House of Representatives, 2012
 Judge Roger W. Titus, U.S. District Court for the District of Maryland, 2014
 Lee Yeakel, United States District Judge, 2017

 Jon A. Husted, House Speaker of Ohio, Ohio Statehouse, Columbus, OH, 2017

 Charles Kurfess, House Speaker of Ohio, Ohio Statehouse, Columbus, OH, 2017

 A. G. Lancione, House Speaker of Ohio, Ohio Statehouse, Columbus, OH, 2017
 Kim Schatzel, President, Towson University, 2017

Awards 

 2003 Honors Award for Portraiture, Portrait Society of America
 2004 Honors Award for Portraiture, Portrait Society of America
 2006 The Certificate of Merit, Portrait Society of America

 2007 Certificate of Excellence, Portrait Society of America
 2022 1st Place Commissioned Portrait, Members Only Competition, Portrait Society of America
 2023 Signature Status, Portrait Society of America

References

External links 
 https://archive.org/details/RG0044_s013_c024_f008/page/n37/mode/2up
 https://www.ronwhitmorelive.com/art-fusion-radio.html
 https://archive.org/details/directoryofameri0000unse_v7d5/page/683/mode/2up?q=Ned+Bittinger

1951 births
Living people
American children's book illustrators
21st-century artists
George Washington University alumni
Denison University alumni
Painters from Washington, D.C.
American portrait painters
American male painters
21st-century American painters
20th-century American painters
21st-century American male artists
20th-century American male artists
Corcoran School of the Arts and Design alumni